Chris Dorland (born 1978) is a Canadian/American Contemporary artist based in New York City. His paintings and video works combine hyper-representation and hyper-abstraction by manipulating digital imagery, paint and software.

Early life and education
Dorland was born in Montreal, Quebec. He received his BFA from State University of New York at Purchase.

Artwork
Dorland is known for large scale, glitchy  paintings and digital works that address Artificial intelligence , video games , and machine vision. His neon hued dystopian abstractions layer and compress digital detritus into glitch datascapes.  Dorland uses scanners, printers and drones to develop layered and chaotic works that reference hyperreality, technology and Capitalism in an aesthetic reminiscent of tech noir.  In the April 2021 issue of frieze magazine writer Natasha Stagg ’s essay Painting the End of The World  discusses Dorland’s work in relation to the Cyberpunk genre and the cinematic influence of films such as Johnny Mnemonic (film), RoboCop and Blade Runner as well as the video game Cyberpunk 2077 on his work.

Grants and awards
He is the recipient of a number of awards, including the Rema Hort Mann Grant, the Pollock-Krasner Foundation Grant, and the Marie Walsh Sharpe Space Program. Dorland is an alumnus of the Art & Law program residency.

Exhibitions
Dorland's work has been exhibited nationally and internationally at institutions such as FRONT International: The Cleveland Triennial for Contemporary Art, the Queens Museum of Art, New York and Museo Nacional De Bellas Artes, Santiago, Chile, White Flag Projects, St-Louis, MO, and The Suburban, Oak Park, IL. He has exhibited at galleries including Lyles & King, Martos LA, Rhona Hoffman Gallery, Marc Selwyn Fine Art, Sikkema Jenkins, Marianne Boesky Gallery, Valentina Bonomo Gallery, and Super Dakota, Brussels. His work is included in numerous public and private collections, including the Bronx Museum, the Whitney Museum of Art and Neuberger Museum of Art.
He has been featured and reviewed in several publications such as The New York Times, frieze magazine, Art Review, Whitewall Magazine, POSTmatter, Frische, and The WILD Magazine.

Curation and commissions
He has curated exhibitions; notably Skin Jobs at Marc Selwyn Fine Art in Los Angeles and DATA TRASH  at I-20 Gallery in New York. He is Director-at-Large at Magenta Plains. Dorland has also been commissioned to create public projects by Art Production Fund and the New Museum, and Juilliard School of Music

References

External links 
 

1978 births
Living people
21st-century American painters
Digital
American male painters
Digital artists
Anglophone Quebec people
Artists from Montreal
State University of New York at Purchase alumni